Infini is the twelfth studio album and fifteenth release overall by the Canadian heavy metal band Voivod, released on June 23, 2009. It is their last album to include contributions by their late original guitarist Piggy, who died nearly four years earlier, and their last to feature Jason Newsted on bass.

Track listing

Personnel
Voivod
Denis Bélanger a.k.a. Snake – vocals
Denis D'Amour a.k.a. Piggy – guitar
Jason Newsted a.k.a. Jasonic – bass guitar, interludes, producer
Michel Langevin a.k.a. Away – drums, artwork

Production
Glen Robinson - producer, engineer (drums and vocals)
Enrique Gonzalez Muller - engineer (bass), mixing at Fantasy Studios, Berkeley, California
Tom Hutten - mastering

References

2009 albums
Voivod (band) albums
Relapse Records albums
Albums published posthumously
Nuclear Blast albums